Old Town Irvine was designated a California Historic Landmark (No.1004) on November 11, 1991. Old Town Irvine is in the city of Irvine, California in Orange County A Historic marker is at 14980 Sand Canyon Avenue, Irvine. The marker is to remember the founding the City of Town Irvine in 1887. The town of Irvine started as a train stop for the Santa Fe Railroad in 1889, where barley warehouse was built. At the time of founding the town was called Myford, California. Myford was the youngest son of James H. Irvine, who the town would be renamed after. James Irvine called the new town Myford, as at the time there was a City of Irvine in Calaveras County in Northern California. Myford was renamed Irvine in 1914, as the Northern California town changed its name to Carson Hill. The 125,000-acre Irvine Ranch was the largest employer in the town for years, a very busy place during harvest time. The town had a school, general store, blacksmith shop, diner, and a hotel for seasonal workers, all around Central Avenue and the train station. The Ranch lost its place as the center of town in the 1960s, with the housing boom and a new town center was built up. Irvine incorporated as a city in 1971. The old portions of Irvine, renamed East Irvine, had become run down. Much of the old Ranch in East Irvine was abandoned or taken down. Central Avenue was renamed Sand Canyon Ave, which became a main highway. The 1980 plan to make Sand Canyon Ave wider threaten some of the Historic Landmarks in Irvine. A Historic Preservation Committee was formed and the town worked to save Old Town Irvine. The City of Irvine working with the Sand Canyon Historical Partners and the Irvine Historical Society, they came up with a plan to reuse some of the old buildings.

Historic Old Town Irvine
Historic buildings in Old Town Irvine restored:
 The 1895 Sack Warehouse is now office space.
 The 1895 Post Office, reopened.
 The 1912 Irvine Ranch General Store, moved in 1986, now retail and offices space.
 The 1913 Irvine Hotel, moved in 1986, offices space.
 The 1947 Bulk processing warehouse, rebuilt as La Quinta Hotel, with 150 rooms.
 The 1908 Blacksmith shop, rebuilt to Knowlwood Restaurant.
 The 1915 Irvine Service Station, move in 1925 to Burt and Sand Canyon, rebuilt, now fast food restaurant 
 The 1929 Irvine Garage, then a Ford dealership, rebuilt to a Denny's restaurant.
 The 1929 Irvine school, rebuilt now a community center.

Historical Markers
Marker at the site reads:
 The townsite began in 1887 with the arrival of the AT&SF RR. James Irvine II chose this site to be the shipping center for crops grown on the Irvine Ranch, due to its high elevation. Original buildings remaining include the Bean Shed (1895), Bulk Storage Warehouse (1949), Blacksmith Shop (1912), Garage (1929), Tenant Farmhouse (1897), General Store (1912), and Hotel (1913). The hotel and store were moved from across Sand Canyon Avenue in 1986. Erected 1987 by Santa Ana Parlor No. 235, Native Daughters of the Golden West, Santa Ana. (Marker Number 1004.)

Marker records at Office of Historic Preservation reads:
NO. 1004 OLD TOWN IRVINE – Old Town Irvine stands today as a testament to the rich agricultural past of what has become one of California's most heavily urban counties. Founded in 1887 as the distribution and storage center of the 125,000-acre Irvine ranch, Old Town Irvine was to develop over the years a bean and grain storage warehouse (1895) and granary (1947) known as the Irvine Bean and Grain Grower's Building, a blacksmith's shop (1916), a hotel (1913), a general store (1911), and an employees' bungalow (1915). All of these structures have been rehabilitated for commercial uses and their exteriors have been painstakingly maintained.

See also
California Historical Landmarks in Orange County, California

External links

 
Guide to the East Irvine Historic Resources Documentation Photographs, 1988. Special Collections and Archives, The UC Irvine Libraries, Irvine, California.
Guide to the George Leidal Collection on the City of Irvine. Special Collections and Archives, The UC Irvine Libraries, Irvine, California.

References

 
1857 in California
California Historical Landmarks
1857 establishments in California